The Catholic Church in Uzbekistan is part of the worldwide Catholic Church, under the spiritual leadership of the Pope in Rome.
 
There are approximately 5000 Catholics in the country  of 27 million. They are organized under a single Apostolic Administration of Uzbekistan (missionary pre-diocesan jurisdiction). The country currently has five parishes and the bishop hopes to open two more.

Activities 
Various religious orders such as the Franciscans and Mother Teresa's Missionaries of Charity have a presence in the country and assist in activities such as caring for the poor, prisoners, and the sick.
 
There are also attempts to introduce the Catholic charity group Caritas, but has so far been unsuccessful. All missionary and other efforts to convert people to Catholicism from other religions are barred by Uzbek law.

Ecumenical relations 
Muslim–Christian relations in the country are positive.
There are no official relations between the Catholic and Eastern Orthodox Churches in Uzbekistan, however, at the local level priests of the two communities are in dialogue. Relations between Armenian Apostolic Christians, Lutherans and local Catholic communities are positive.

See also 
Religion in Uzbekistan
Christianity in Uzbekistan

References

External links 
 ZENIT News Agency - Rome

 
Uzbekistan